Epicypta is a genus of flies belonging to the family Mycetophilidae.

The genus has cosmopolitan distribution.

Species

Species:

Epicypta acuminata 
Epicypta aczeli 
Epicypta aguarensis

References

Mycetophilidae